Kingdom Under Fire: The Crusaders is a tactical wargame developed by the Korean studio Phantagram for the Xbox. It is the sequel to the 2001 game Kingdom Under Fire: A War of Heroes, and continues its storyline. Kingdom Under Fire: The Crusaders combines third-person action and role-playing elements in its gameplay, which differs from its predecessor.

Its prequel is Kingdom Under Fire: Heroes. Another sequel was released in late 2019 entitled Kingdom Under Fire II for Windows.

A Windows port was released for Steam in February 2020, and resurrected by the co-developer of the original Xbox version, Blueside. A DRM-free version was released on GOG.com in early April 2020. The modern Windows release came with several enhancements including full controller support, plus an all-new mouse & keyboard mode (Though, a gamepad is recommended); modern resolutions and widescreen view.

Gameplay
The gameplay of Kingdom Under Fire: The Crusaders contains elements from the Dynasty Warriors games and aspects of Real-time strategy and role-playing games. As well as controlling the main character, the player fights with multiple armies or "units", which are controlled in real-time with either a minimap or the main screen. When the main character's unit engages in combat with an enemy unit, the gameplay is similar to Dynasty Warriors.

Any unit in close-quarters combat cannot be used for anything else until the combat is resolved; an exception to this is when two units are in close-quarter combat with the enemy: one unit can retreat while the other keeps the enemy unit occupied.

Reviews

The game was very well received receiving an average scores of over 80% on aggregate, with a few minor criticisms. It received runner-up placements in GameSpots 2004 "Best Strategy Game" and "Most Surprisingly Good Game" award categories across all platforms.

References

External links
, official website

2004 video games
Crowd-combat fighting games
Hack and slash games
Microsoft games
Real-time tactics video games
Video games about vampires
Video games developed in South Korea
Video games featuring female protagonists
Video game franchises
Windows games
Xbox games
Single-player video games
Deep Silver games
Phantagram games
Blueside games